The Tonalá River is a river of Mexico. It originates in the hilly region south of Nezahualcóyotl Reservoir, near where the borders of Chiapas, Tabasco, and Veracruz meet. It flows north-northwest to empty into the Gulf of Mexico. It forms the border between Tabasco and Veracruz states for most of its length.

Juan de Grijalva's 1518 expedition named it Rio de San Antonio.

See also
List of rivers of Mexico

References

Atlas of Mexico, 1975 (http://www.lib.utexas.edu/maps/atlas_mexico/river_basins.jpg).
The Prentice Hall American World Atlas, 1984.
Rand McNally, The New International Atlas, 1993.

Rivers of Tabasco
Rivers of Veracruz
Petén–Veracruz moist forests
Drainage basins of the Gulf of Mexico